Laurent Marie Guespin-Malet (born 3 September 1955, in Bayonne) is a French actor, and the twin brother of actor Pierre Malet.

Life
Malet's stage debut came in La guerre de Troie n'aura pas lieu as Troilus alongside Claude Jade in 1975. In 1978 he was made famous by his role as Andrew alongside Donald Sutherland and Stéphane Audran in Les Liens de sang by Claude Chabrol. That same year, Gilles Béhat gave him the lead role in Haro. En 1979, he starred alongside Yves Montand in Les Routes du sud by Joseph Losey and played Lino Ventura's son in Jigsaw (L'Homme en colère). He also played Roger Bataille in Rainer Werner Fassbinder's Querelle (after Jean Genet), and starred alongside Sandrine Bonnaire in 1984's Tir à vue, directed by Marc Angelo.  In 1995 he played Arthur Rimbaud in Marc Rivière's L'Homme aux semelles de vent.

Highly attached to his brother and mother, he feels asked by the latter (in the terminal stages of a brain tumour) to put an end to her sufferings.  He writes of this in his 2006 book En attendant la suite, in which he calls on the candidates in the presidential election to bring the state to legislate on euthanasia.

Filmography
 Haro (1978), by Gilles Béhat
 Les Liens de sang (1978), by Claude Chabrol
 Les Routes du Sud (1978), by Joseph Losey
 Comme un boomerang (1976), by José Giovanni
 Bobo Jacco (1979), by Walter Bal
 Le Cœur à l'envers (1980), by Franck Apprédéris
 La Légion saute sur Kolwezi (1980), by Raoul Coutard
 Querelle (1982), by Rainer Werner Fassbinder
 Invitation au voyage (1982), by Peter Del Monte
 A mort l'arbitre ! (1983), by Jean-Pierre Mocky
 Tir à vue (1984), by Marc Angelo
 Viva la vie (1984), by Claude Lelouch
 Parking (1985), by Jacques Demy
 La Puritaine (1986), by Jacques Doillon
 Charlie Dingo (1987), by Gilles Béhat
 Les Possédés (1988), by Andrzej Wajda
 Arthur Rimbaud, l'homme aux semelles de vent (1995), by Marc Rivière
 Le Plus beau pays du monde (1999), by Marcel Bluwal
 Ce jour-là (2003), by Raoul Ruiz

TV
1976: Le siècle des lumières by Claude Brulé
1977: La foire by Roland Vincent
1981: Les avocats du diable d'André Cayatte
1981:  Confusion of Feelings 
1982: Pleine lune by Jean-Pierre Richard
1984: Cuore by Luigi Comencini
1985: La part de l'autre by Jeanne Labrune
1986: Sword of Gideon by Michael Anderson
1991: The First Circle by Sheldon Larry
1993: Monsieur Ripois by Luc Béraud
1994: Le feu follet by Gérard Vergez
1995: L'homme aux semelles de vent by Marc Rivière
1997: Marion du Faouët by Michel Favart
2001: Des croix sur la mer by Luc Béraud
2001: Le Prix de la vérité by Joël Santoni
2004: Les amants du bagne by Thierry Binisti
2005: Galilée ou l'amour de Dieu by Jean-Daniel Verhaeghe

Réalisateur/Scénariste
 1993 : Au nom d'un chien (short)

External links
 
 Homepage

1955 births
Living people
People from Bayonne
French male film actors
French male television actors